Agathodaemon of Alexandria (Agathodaímōn Alexandreùs) was a Greek or Hellenized cartographer, presumably from Alexandria, Egypt, in late Antiquity, probably in the 2nd century A.D. 

Agathodaemon is mentioned in some of the earliest manuscripts of Ptolemy's Geography:
"From the eight books of geography of Claudius Ptolemaeus the whole habitable world Agathodaemon of Alexandria delineated."
The line appears in the running text of the Geography and not as a caption on the maps themselves. Since the inscriptions are the only surviving reference to him and these manuscripts only survive from the very late 13th century, the most that can be stated conclusively is that he lived sometime between the years AD 150 and 1300, although his classical name and his epithet—"the Alexandrian"—probably places him before that city's fall to the Caliphate in 641 and not contemporary with Maximus Planudes's reconstruction of the Ptolemaic atlas after 1295.

In the Geography, Ptolemy shows his familiarity with existing maps, complaining of the inaccuracies introduced by cartographers to Marinus of Tyre's work through his failure to provide proper accompanying data, a fault Ptolemy remedied by providing sample captions in his own books VII and VIII. In those sections, he explicitly mentions that his text was to be accompanied by maps constructed according to his principles. Heeren argued for Agathodaemon having been the cartographer responsible for these original maps; Dinse for his having been the transcriber of the original papyrus scrolls to codices; and Fischer for a strictly literal reading of the inscription, showing that differences in the early manuscripts imply Agathodaemon drafted the world map but not the regional maps.

A major consideration is that the current form of Ptolemy's regional maps are done according to Marinus's cylindrical projection—which Ptolemy disparages—rather than either of Ptolemy's; the world map is done according to the less-favored of the two projections Ptolemy offers.

Agathodaemon is sometimes conflated or confused with two other figures: the 3rd-century alchemist Agathodaemon and the 5th-century grammarian Agathodaemon who corresponded with Isidore of Pelusium.

See also
 Claudius Ptolemy
 The Geography
 Ptolemy's world map
 The Canopic Branch of the Nile Delta, called the Agathodaemon by Ptolemy
 Other Agathodaemons

Notes

Citations

References
 .
 .
 . 
 . 
 . 
 .
 .
 .

Ptolemy
Roman-era Alexandrians
Ancient Greek cartographers